The Edge is a member of the Irish rock band U2.

The Edge may also refer to:

Film
 The Edge (1968 film), a film by Robert Kramer
 The Edge (1989 film), a television movie starring Rutger Hauer
 The Edge (1997 film), a survival adventure drama starring Anthony Hopkins and Alec Baldwin
 The Edge (2010 film), a Russian drama by Alexei Uchitel

Television
 The Edge TV, a New Zealand music television channel
 The Edge (TV series), a 1992–1993 American television sketch-comedy series
 The Edge (game show), a 2015 British quiz show
 The Edge, a gaming guide show on XLEAGUE.TV
 The Edge, an Alaskan gold mining dredge on the reality TV show Bering Sea Gold

Literature 
 The Edge (novel), a 2002 young adult novel by Alan Gibbons
 The Edge Chronicles, a fantasy book series by Paul Stewart and Chris Riddell
 The Edge (book series), a fantasy book series by Ilona Andrews
 The Edge (Malaysia), a weekly financial newspaper in Malaysia
 The Edge (magazine), an entertainment magazine at the University of Southampton
 The Maine Edge, or The Edge, a weekly newspaper published in Bangor, Maine, U.S.
 The Edge, a 2005–2007 student newspaper at Fort Hays State University
 The Edge, a 1988 thriller by Dick Francis

Music 
 The Edge Festival, a music festival in Edinburgh, Scotland
 The Edge (club), a defunct nightclub in Coventry, England, originally The Eclipse
 The Edge, an early-1980s British band featuring Gem Archer

Albums 
 The Edge (compilation album), an alternative music compilation, 2010
 The Edge (Ike Turner album), 1980
 The Edge, by Eternity X, 1997

Songs 
 "The Edge" (song), by Tonight Alive from the soundtrack of The Amazing Spider-Man 2, 2014
 "The Edge", by Blind Guardian from A Twist in the Myth, 2006
 "The Edge", by David McCallum
 "The Edge", by Reks from REBELutionary, 2012

Places 
 The Edge (Amsterdam), the Deloitte headquarters in Amsterdam
 The Edge at Avenue North, an apartment complex at Temple University
 The Edge (Beirut), the tallest building in Lebanon
 The Edge, a digital culture centre at the State Library of Queensland
 The Edge, a feature of the Eureka Tower in Melbourne, Australia
 The Edge, a future building at the Eden Project in Cornwall, England
 The Edge (New York), an observation deck in New York City's Hudson Yards development
 The Edge Performing Arts & Convention Centre, in Auckland, New Zealand
 The Edge, a red sandstone escarpment above the village of Alderley Edge, Cheshire, UK

Radio 
 102.5 The Edge, in Deniliquin, New South Wales, Australia
 CADA, formerly The Edge 96.1, in Sydney, Australia
 L107 or The Edge, in West Central Scotland
 WEDG or 103.3 The Edge, in Buffalo, New York, U.S.
 The Edge (radio station), in New Zealand
 WNKS in Charlotte, North Carolina, U.S. (formerly 95.1 The Edge)
102.1 The Edge (disambiguation):
CFNY-FM (branded as 102.1 The Edge) in Toronto, Canada
Edge FM 102.1 in Wangaratta, Victoria, Australia
KDGE (branded as Star 102.1) in Dallas, Texas, U.S. (formerly 102.1 The Edge)

See also 
 Edge (disambiguation)
 On the Edge (disambiguation)
 Over the Edge (disambiguation)